William Calvin Hodge was a stone mason, alderman, and state legislator in Tennessee. He represented Hamilton County, Tennessee in the 44th Tennessee General Assembly from 1885 to 1886.

Hodge was born in North Carolina. He was a stone mason and did other jobs around Chattanooga before becoming a contractor, house mover, alderman for the 4th Ward of the City of Chattanooga (1878-1887), city jailer, and state representative. He had a wife named Lou and either three sons or one depending on the source.

He negotiated with Democrats who needed Republican participation to achieve a quorum and secured four additional African American policeman, a jailer position, and sexton. He and Styles L. Hutchins were black representatives from Chattanooga and were among the city's African American city council members in the late 19th century.

See also
African-American officeholders during and following the Reconstruction era

References

Year of birth missing
Republican Party members of the Tennessee House of Representatives
People from North Carolina
19th-century American politicians
Politicians from Chattanooga, Tennessee
American stonemasons
African-American state legislators in Tennessee
Tennessee city council members